Cordas may refer to:
 Darko Čordaš (born 1976), Croatian football player
 Dino 7 Cordas (1918–2006), Brazilian guitar player
 Leon Còrdas (1913–1987), Occitan playwright
 A.C. Cordas, designer of the Steinruck SCS-1, a glider

See also
 Corda (disambiguation)